Phil Nobile Jr. is a writer, producer, and director of non-fiction video entertainment. He is currently the Editor-in-Chief of Fangoria. He is also known for his movie reviews for Birth.Movies.Death.

Career 
Nobile was a producer in Philadelphia from 2001-2018, working on game shows, home improvement shows, true crime series and other documentary projects.

At the website Birth.Movies.Death., he wrote about genre films for eight years from 2010-2018, with a focus on the James Bond franchise. His writing on the Bond franchise has also appeared on Rotten Tomatoes, Esquire, and Thrillist.

In March 2018, Nobile became Editor-in-Chief of the American horror film magazine Fangoria.

Filmography (selected)

References

External links 
 

Living people
American film producers
American film directors
Year of birth missing (living people)